This list of Dominica writers includes those born in or associated with the Commonwealth of Dominica.

A
 Phyllis Shand Allfrey (1908–1986)
 Thomas Atwood (died 1793)

C
 J. R. Ralph Casimir (1898–1996)

H
 Lennox Honychurch (born 1952)

N
 Elma Napier (1892–1973)

R
 Jean Rhys (1890–1979)

S
 Edward Scobie (1918–1996)

T
 Daniel Thaly

References

External links

 "TDN Literature", The Dominican.
 Lennox Honychurch, "Cultural Icons of Dominica", A Virtual Dominica.
 Lizabeth Paravisini-Gebert, "'A Forgotten Outpost of Empire': Social Life in Dominica and the Creative Imagination", Vassar University.
 "Dominica", Papillote Press – Books from the Caribbean.

 
Dominica